E98 may refer to:
 European route E98
 King's Indian Defense, Encyclopaedia of Chess Openings code

See also 
 E postcode area